AS1 or AS-1 may refer to:

 ActionScript version 1
 As One (Hong Kong band)
 AS1 (networking)
 AS-1, a Soviet-era prototype assault rifle that led to the AN-94
 Raduga KS-1 Komet, a missile referred to as the AS-1 'Kennel' by the West
 RuPaul's Drag Race All Stars 1 (season 1)
 Smith & Wesson AS, a 12-gauge select-fire shotgun.